Vidushi Dr. Kamala Shankar a renowned first lady Indian Classical Slide Guitar musician has enthralled the world through her immaculate and melodious rendition of Hindustani Classical music. Kamala has the credit to invent the Shankar Slide Guitar. She is known for her tremendous control and versatility along with the depth on her instrument. She has an exceptional and natural ability to play the ‘Gayaki Ang’ style.Her music is popularly referred as singing guitar.

Shankar is the first slide guitarist to receive the National Award in Music " Rashtriya Kumar Gandharva Samman" in 2013 by the Government of Madhya Pradesh.

Early years 

Kamala Shankar, born in Tanjore (Tamil Nadu) and brought up in Varanasi. At the age of 4 she was initiated into vocal music by her mother and was put under the able guidance of Guru Pt. Amarnath Mishra of Varanasi and learnt Hindustani classical vocal for 8 years. The most momentous discovery was the Hawaiian slide guitar. Her initial training of Guitar started with Dr. Shivnath Bhattacharya and was given valuable guidance by Guru Padmabhushan Pt. Chhannulal Mishra of Varanasi. She has not only learnt classical but also the Poorab Ang like Thumri,  Kajari, Dadra, Chaiti with Rabindra Sangeet and Bhajan. Later on she was under the able guidance of Pt. Bimalendu Mukherjee for few years. A Researcher,She holds Doctorate for her work on the styles & techniques of slide guitar which she completed under Dr. Gopal Shankar Mishra from Faculty of Performing Arts Banaras Hindu University.

References
‘Shankar guitar' performance enthrals audience, The Hindu KOLLAM, 12 January 2012.
Her guitar is a Shankar, The Hindu Friday Review " Music 7 August 2014.
Hindustani classics on guitar, The Hindu, KERALA 7 July 2010.
Unique experience for music lovers, The Hindu, Kerala MALAPPURAM, 12 May 2014.
A brush with the past The Hindu 1 January 2014.
The Hindu 8 August 2014.
Stringing along The Hindu, 10 October 2008 .
http://digitalpaper.mathrubhumi.com/m/1095653/Kottayam/FEBRUARY-06,-2017#issue/2/1 Mathrubhumi Kottayam 6 Feb 2017.
http://digitalpaper.mathrubhumi.com/m/1085528/Mathrubhumi/JANUARY-28,-2017#issue/26/1
http://www.easternmirrornagaland.com/handshake-concert-raj-bhavan-sings-for-friendship-and-unity/
http://epaper.punjabkesari.in/m5/733377/punjab-kesari-himachal-shimla-kesari/Shimla-kesari#page/2/1
http://m.epaper.bhaskar.com/shimla-bhaskar/184/27022016/cph/4/
http://epaper.divyahimachal.com/m5/733008/Mera-Shimla/Mera-Shimla#page/2/1
http://digitalpaper.mathrubhumi.com/1083842/Mathrubhumi/JANUARY-26,-2017#page/27
http://digitalpaper.mathrubhumi.com/1096875/Thrissur/07-February-2017#page/23
INDIA TODAY MAGAZINE 30 June 2014
https://www.thehindu.com/entertainment/music/giving-hawaiian-guitar-a-classical-makeover/article25960289.ece] The Hindu 10 January 2019

Discography
Music Melody on Guitar By HMV(RPG) Raga Bageshri, Raga Shyam kalyan & Dhun in Mishra Kafi
Great Masters by Eli Lily & Company [India] Pvt.Ltd.
Tantarang by Mystica Music Raga Jog & Raga Miya Malhar
Jhankar Rich Heritage by Legendary Legacy Promotions Pvt.Ltd. Raga Bairagi, Raga Bilaskhani Todi & Mishra Pahadi Dhun

External links
 Official web site

1966 births
Living people
Indian guitarists
Banaras Hindu University alumni
Etawah gharana
Musicians from Varanasi
Women guitarists
People from Thanjavur district
Musicians from Uttar Pradesh
Indian women classical musicians
Women musicians from Uttar Pradesh
20th-century Indian women musicians
20th-century Indian musicians